An epigenome consists of a record of the chemical changes to the DNA and histone proteins of an organism; these changes can be passed down to an organism's offspring via transgenerational stranded epigenetic inheritance. Changes to the epigenome can result in changes to the structure of chromatin and changes to the function of the genome.

The epigenome is involved in regulating gene expression, development, tissue differentiation, and suppression of transposable elements. Unlike the underlying genome, which remains largely static within an individual, the epigenome can be dynamically altered by environmental conditions.

Cancer 
Epigenetics is a currently active topic in cancer research. Human tumors undergo a major disruption of DNA methylation and histone modification patterns. The aberrant epigenetic landscape of the cancer cell is characterized by a global genomic hypomethylation, CpG island promoter hypermethylation of tumor suppressor genes, an altered histone code for critical genes and a global loss of monoacetylated and trimethylated histone H4.

Epigenome research projects 
As a prelude to a potential Human Epigenome Project, the Human Epigenome Pilot Project aims to identify and catalogue Methylation Variable Positions (MVPs) in the human genome. Advances in sequencing technology now allow for assaying genome-wide epigenomic states by multiple molecular methodologies.  Micro- and nanoscale devices have been constructed or proposed to investigate the epigenome.

An international effort to assay reference epigenomes commenced in 2010 in the form of the International Human Epigenome Consortium (IHEC). IHEC members aim to generate at least 1,000 reference (baseline) human epigenomes from different types of normal and disease-related human cell types.

Roadmap epigenomics project
One goal of the NIH Roadmap Epigenomics Project is to generate human reference epigenomes from normal, healthy individuals across a large variety of cell lines, primary cells, and primary tissues. Data produced by the project, which can be browsed and downloaded from the Human Epigenome Atlas, fall into five types that assay different aspects of the epigenome and outcomes of epigenomic states (such as gene expression):

 Histone Modifications – Chromatin Immunoprecipitation Sequencing (ChIP-Seq) identifies genome wide patterns of histone modifications using antibodies against the modifications.
 DNA Methylation – Whole Genome Bisulfite-Seq, Reduced Representation Bisulfite-Seq (RRBS), Methylated DNA Immunoprecipitation Sequencing (MeDIP-Seq), and Methylation-sensitive Restriction Enzyme Sequencing (MRE-Seq) identify DNA methylation across portions of the genome at varying levels of resolution down to basepair level.
 Chromatin Accessibility –  DNase I hypersensitive sites Sequencing (DNase-Seq) uses the DNase I enzyme to find open or accessible regions in the genome.  
 Gene Expression – RNA-Seq and expression arrays identify expression levels or protein coding genes.
 Small RNA Expression – smRNA-Seq identifies expression of small noncoding RNA, primarily miRNAs.

Reference epigenomes for healthy individuals will enable the second goal of the Roadmap Epigenomics Project, which is to examine epigenomic differences that occur in disease states such as Alzheimer's disease.

See also 
 Epigenetics
 Epigenome editing
 Human epigenome
 NCBI Epigenomics

References

External links 
 Reference Epigenome Mapping Consortium Homepage
 NCBI Epigenomics Hub
 NCBI Gene Expression Omnibus Epigenomics
 The Human Epigenome Atlas
 Roadmap Epigenomics Visualization Hub
 Roadmap Epigenomics Visualization Hub (load track hub)
  Human Epigenome Browser at Washington University
 Epigenome Browser UCSC mirror 
 Human Epigenome Project
 Cancer Research

Epigenetics